The A474 is a suburban main route in south Wales.

Route
Settlements served by the A474 include:
Briton Ferry
Neath
Neath Abbey
Cadoxton
Rhyddings
Fforest Goch
Rhos
Gellinudd
Pontardawe
Gelligron
Rhydyfro
Cwmgors
Gwaun-Cae-Gurwen
Glanamman
Ammanford

References

Transport in Carmarthenshire
Transport in Neath Port Talbot
Roads in Wales